The Saguenay Fjord were an ice hockey team in Saguenay, Quebec. They played in the Ligue Nord-Americaine de Hockey from 2002 to 2005. The club was founded as Saguenay Paramedic in 2002, in 2004, they changed to Saguenay Fjord.

Notable players
Sébastien Caron
Link Gaetz

External links
 The Internet Hockey Database

Ice hockey teams in Quebec
Defunct Ligue Nord-Américaine de Hockey teams
Quebec Semi-Pro Hockey League teams
Sport in Saguenay, Quebec